The European section of the 2018 FIFA World Cup qualification acted as qualifiers for the 2018 FIFA World Cup, which was held in Russia, for national teams that are members of the Union of European Football Associations (UEFA). Apart from Russia, who qualified automatically as hosts, a total of 13 slots in the final tournament were available for UEFA teams.

The qualifying format was confirmed by the UEFA Executive Committee meeting on 22–23 March 2015 in Vienna.

The qualification process started on 4 September 2016, almost two months after UEFA Euro 2016, and ended on 14 November 2017.
Belgium, England, France, Germany, Iceland (for the first time), Poland, Portugal, Serbia, and Spain qualified in the first round by winning their groups. Croatia, Denmark, Sweden and Switzerland qualified by winning their playoffs.

Four-time champions Italy did not qualify for the 2018 FIFA World Cup, missing out on qualification for the first time since 1958 after losing in the playoffs to Sweden, while the three-time FIFA World Cup runners-up Netherlands did not qualify for the tournament for the first time since 2002 after finishing third in 2014, and second in 2010. Iceland, with 335,000 inhabitants, became the smallest country ever to qualify for a FIFA World Cup.

Entrants
Apart from Russia, which qualified automatically as hosts, all remaining 52 FIFA-affiliated national teams from UEFA at the registration deadline of January 2015 entered qualification.

Gibraltar, despite being a UEFA member since 2013, was not a FIFA member at the time of the registration deadline, and thus was not eligible to enter qualification for the FIFA World Cup. They appealed to the Court of Arbitration for Sport to challenge FIFA's refusal to grant membership in order to enter World Cup qualifying. In May 2016, the CAS found in Gibraltar's favour and ordered that FIFA put Gibraltar forward for FIFA membership, which would permit Gibraltar to take part in the qualifiers if membership was granted.

Kosovo became a UEFA member on 3 May 2016, and together with Gibraltar, applied for membership in the FIFA Congress in 12–13 May 2016. FIFA confirmed that in the case both associations succeeded in becoming a member, they would be entitled to participate in the 2018 FIFA World Cup qualifiers, with UEFA tasked to integrate them into the competition.

On 13 May 2016, both Kosovo and Gibraltar were officially admitted as FIFA members, thus allowing them to compete. UEFA created a task force to discuss how to integrate the two teams into the competition, and on 9 June 2016 UEFA announced that Kosovo would be assigned to Group I, to avoid meeting Bosnia and Herzegovina for security reasons, and Gibraltar would play in Group H.

Format
The qualification structure was as follows:
First round (group stage): 54 teams were divided into nine groups of six teams each to play home-and-away round-robin matches. The winners of each group qualified for the 2018 FIFA World Cup, and the eight best runners-up advanced to the second round (play-offs).
Second round (play-offs): Eight best runners-up from the first round played against one other team over two legs, home and away. The draw for these matches was held on 17 October 2017. The first legs were played on 9–11 November, and the second legs were played on 12–14 November 2017. The winners of each tie qualified for the World Cup.

Qualifying matches started in September 2016, following UEFA Euro 2016, and finished in November 2017.

The scheduling of qualifying matches, which were centralised by UEFA, followed the "Week of Football" concept first used for UEFA Euro 2016 qualifying:
Matches take place from Thursday to Tuesday.
Kick-off times are largely set at 18:00 and 20:45 CET/CEST on Saturdays and Sundays, and 20:45 CET/CEST on Thursdays, Fridays, Mondays and Tuesdays.
On double-header matchweeks, teams play on Thursday and Sunday, or Friday and Monday, or Saturday and Tuesday.
Matches in the same group are played on the same day.

The fixture list was confirmed by UEFA on 26 July 2015, the day following the draw.

First round

Seeding
The draw for the first round (group stage) occurred as part of the 2018 FIFA World Cup Preliminary Draw on 25 July 2015, starting 18:00 MSK (UTC+3), at the Konstantinovsky Palace in Strelna, Saint Petersburg, Russia.

The seeding was based on the July 2015 FIFA World Rankings. The 52 teams were seeded into six pots:
Pot 1 contains the teams ranked 1–9.
Pot 2 contains the teams ranked 10–18.
Pot 3 contains the teams ranked 19–27.
Pot 4 contains the teams ranked 28–36.
Pot 5 contains the teams ranked 37–45.
Pot 6 contains the teams ranked 46–52.

Each six-team group contained one team from each of the six pots, while each five-team group contained one team from each of the first five pots.

Due to the centralisation of media rights for European qualifiers, England, France, Germany, Italy, Spain and the Netherlands were all drawn into six-team groups. Netherlands and France were drawn together in Group A, and Spain and Italy were drawn together in Group G.

In consideration of the political relations between Armenia and Azerbaijan, UEFA requested that FIFA maintain the current UEFA policy not to draw these teams into the same qualification groups (since the two teams were in the same seeding pot, this would not have happened regardless of the request).

Teams in bold eventually qualified for the final tournament, teams in bold italic qualified for the final tournament through the play-offs, and teams in italic participated in the play-offs but did not qualify for the final tournament.

The football associations of Gibraltar and Kosovo became members of FIFA after the draw had taken place but before any games had been played. It was decided that both would be added to the World Cup qualifying process in Groups H and I, making those groups up to six teams each; due to the disputed political status of Kosovo, for security reasons, it was decided that Kosovo could not play against Bosnia and Herzegovina or Serbia, which meant Kosovo was added to Group I and Gibraltar to Group H. Gibraltar and Spain had previously been kept separate from each other in UEFA Euro 2016 qualifying as a result of the disputed status of Gibraltar.

The hosts Russia were originally to be partnered with five-team Group H for friendlies. However, with the admission of Kosovo and Gibraltar, all groups were filled to contain six teams and the Russia friendlies against Group H teams were cancelled. UEFA vice-president Hryhoriy Surkis said that the UEFA management would deal with the issue of finding opponents for Russia to play friendlies.

Summary

Groups

Group A

Group B

Group C

Group D

Group E

Group F

Group G

Group H

Group I

Ranking of second-placed teams
When the draw was made, groups H and I had one team fewer than the other groups so it was decided that matches against the last-placed team in each of the six-team groups would not be included in the ranking of the second-placed teams even after the admission of Kosovo and Gibraltar. As a result, only eight matches played by each team were counted in the second-placed table.

The eight best runners-up were determined by the following parameters, in this order:
 Highest number of points
 Goal difference
 Highest number of goals scored
 Fair play points
 Drawing of lots

Second round

The eight best group runners-up contested the second round, where they were paired into four two-legged (home-and-away) fixtures.

Seeding and draw
The draw for the second round (play-offs) was held on 17 October 2017, 14:00 CEST (UTC+2), at the FIFA headquarters in Zürich, Switzerland. The eight teams were seeded by FIFA World Rankings published on 16 October 2017, rather than qualifying record, with the top four teams in Pot 1, and the remaining four teams in Pot 2. It so happened that the top four teams by qualifying record were the same as the top four by FIFA World Ranking. Teams from Pot 1 played teams from Pot 2 on a home and away basis, with the order of legs decided by draw.

Matches
The first legs were played on 9–11 November, and the second legs were played on 12–14 November 2017. The winners of each tie qualified for the World Cup.

Qualified teams
The following 14 teams from UEFA qualified for the final tournament.

1 Bold indicates champions for that year. Italic indicates hosts for that year.
2 Competed as Soviet Union.
3 Competed as West Germany. A separate team for East Germany also participated in qualifications during this time, having only competed in 1974.
4 From 1930 to 1998, Serbia competed as Yugoslavia, while in 2006 as Serbia and Montenegro.

Top goalscorers
16 goals

 Robert Lewandowski

15 goals

 Cristiano Ronaldo

11 goals

 Romelu Lukaku
 Christian Eriksen

9 goals

 André Silva

8 goals

 Marcus Berg

7 goals

 Stevan Jovetić

6 goals

 Eden Hazard
 Kostas Mitroglou
 Ciro Immobile
 Arjen Robben
 Aleksandar Mitrović
 Andriy Yarmolenko

Branding
UEFA unveiled the branding for the qualifiers on 15 April 2013. It shows a national jersey inside a heart, and represents Europe, honour and ambition. The same branding was also used for the European qualifiers for the UEFA Euro 2016.

Broadcasting

Sponsors
 Carlsberg
 Continental AG
 Hisense
 Konami
 SOCAR
 Turkish Airlines
 Würth
 Adidas

References

External links

Qualifiers – Europe, FIFA.com
FIFA World Cup, UEFA.com

 
Uefa
FIFA World Cup qualification (UEFA)
FIFA World Cup qualification
FIFA World Cup qualification